Acrotriche divaricata is a prickly shrub native to southern Australia, growing to 2 metres tall. Often found in sheltered sites, near rainforest or in eucalyptus forest. Mostly seen growing south of Newcastle, New South Wales. The specific epithet divaricata, refers to the plant's form, being straggling and much branched.

In 1810, this species appeared in scientific literature, in Prodromus Florae Novae Hollandiae, authored by the prolific Scottish botanist, Robert Brown.

References

divaricata
Ericales of Australia
Flora of New South Wales
Flora of Victoria (Australia)
Plants described in 1810